Sir Francis Blake Delaval KB (16 March 1727 – 7 August 1771) was a British actor, soldier and Member of Parliament. He had a privileged and aristocratic education at Westminster School, Eton College and then Christ Church at Oxford University.

Life
Delaval was the eldest son of Captain Francis Blake Delaval RN of Seaton Delaval Hall, and he succeeded to his father's estate in 1752. He added to it by building the folly known as Starlight Castle, overlooking Holywell Dene which leads to Seaton Sluice. It was allegedly built in a single day to win a wager. Little survives of it now apart from a single stone arch.

Delaval fell in love with a singer and actor named Ann Catley in about 1760. She had been apprenticed to William Bates, who was a composer and singing teacher. Bates sold Ann's apprenticeship to Delaval. Bates was given money by Delaval to make up for any financial loss to him, but Catley's father could see that Ann had been sold. Aided by his employer, her father sued Delaval and Bates but to no benefit. Eventually the relationship with Delaval ended and Catley continued her career.

Francis was an actor in a group led by Samuel Foote. He was a gambler but could not afford that lifestyle. He married the wealthy (and much older) Isabella, daughter of Thomas Tufton, 6th Earl of Thanet and widow of Lord Nassau Powlett, but it was not a happy marriage. His wife filed a lawsuit against him because of adultery with an actress, Miss La Roche, for which Isabella unknowingly forked out £1500.

His military career was of short duration. He took part in the Raid on St Malo, and received a knighthood for his bravery when storming the Brittany beach, although there were no French troops present to offer resistance.

He represented Hindon in Wiltshire in Parliament from 1751 to 1754, and Andover in Hampshire from 1754 to 1768.

His London townhouse was 11 Downing Street, now the official home of the Chancellor of the Exchequer.

He suffered a stroke, and was memorialized by his obituarist as "'the very soul of frolic and amusement (who) overbalanced a few foibles by a thousand amiable qualities". He left four illegitimate children but no legitimate ones and was succeeded by his younger brother John Hussey Delaval, later Baron Delaval.

References

Footnotes

Sources
 
 
 The history of Parliament, section 1715-1754.
 The history of Parliament, section 1754-1790.
 Lotnotes by a painting of Francis Blake Delaval after Joshua Reynold. Bonhams, 5 September 2012

1727 births
1771 deaths
People educated at Eton College
Alumni of Christ Church, Oxford
British MPs 1747–1754
British MPs 1754–1761
British MPs 1761–1768
Knights Companion of the Order of the Bath
Members of the Parliament of Great Britain for English constituencies
People educated at Westminster School, London
English male stage actors
18th-century English male actors